Angola has competed in nine Summer Olympic Games. They have not yet won an Olympic medal and never complete the Winter Olympic Games until its debut. The best positions of the nation, 7th in 1996 and 8th in 2016, were both achieved by Angola women's national handball team.

Angola sent at the Summer Olympics 2016 the most athletes (26) and competed in the most events (7) out of all the countries in Central Africa. They did not win a medal however. Angola's youngest athlete in 2016 was Leite Hermenegildo, who was 16. Leite competed in Athletics. Angola's oldest athlete was Joao Paulo de Leiria E Silva who was 52 and competed in Shooting.

Medal tables

Medals by Summer Games

Flagbearers

References

External links
 
 
 

 
Olympics